Maryland elected its members October 5, 1829 after the term began but before Congress convened.

See also 
 1828 and 1829 United States House of Representatives elections
 List of United States representatives from Maryland

1829
Maryland
United States House of Representatives